Joan Muriel Mattingley (married name Cameron; 5 March 1926 – 27 July 2015) was a New Zealand clinical chemist.

Mattingley was born in Wellington on 5 March 1926, and was educated at Wellington Girls' College. When aged 17, she applied to work at the Department of Scientific and Industrial Research but was told that girls could not become botanists "because it required tramping". Mattingley graduated with a Bachelor of Science degree from Victoria University College in 1949, and completed a PhD in biological chemistry from Victoria University of Wellington in 1977. She worked as a clinical chemist, and rose to become the senior scientific officer in the biochemistry research unit at Wellington Hospital.

Mattingley was twice president of the New Zealand Association of Scientists (NZAS) in 1987/88 and 1988/89. During her tenure, the NZAS made many submissions on government restructuring of the New Zealand science system. Mattingley referred to these changes as "extraordinary upheavals" that would devastate New Zealand science and create a "generally confused, bewildered, insecure scientific community".

Her biography of the scientist Brian Shorland was published under her married name, Joan Cameron.

Mattingley died in Paraparaumu on 27 July 2015, having been predeceased by her husband, Charles Cameron.

In 2017, Mattingley was selected as one of the Royal Society Te Apārangi's "150 women in 150 words", celebrating the contributions of women to knowledge in New Zealand.

Selected publications

References 

1926 births
2015 deaths
People educated at Wellington Girls' College
New Zealand women chemists
Victoria University of Wellington alumni
People from Wellington City